Jaysinhji Mansinhji Chauhan was an Indian politician. He was elected to the Lok Sabha, the lower house of the Parliament of India as a member of the Bharatiya Janata Party.

References

External links
Official biographical sketch in Parliament of India website

Bharatiya Janata Party politicians from Gujarat
India MPs 1996–1997
India MPs 1998–1999
Lok Sabha members from Gujarat
1952 births
Living people